Wesley MacInnes is a Canadian country musician who performs under the stage name Wes Mack. He is also an actor and a director.

Early life
MacInnes was born in Calgary, Alberta. He lives in Vancouver, British Columbia.

Music career
MacInnes performs as a country musician under the name Wes Mack. In June 2013, Mack released his debut single, "Duet" (featuring Carly McKillip of Canadian country duo One More Girl) to Canadian country radio. The song, mixed by renowned producer Joey Moi, peaked at number 9 on the Country Billboard Chart and also landed Mack the overall grand prize in the International Unsigned Only Music competition.

In September 2013, Mack received a Canadian Country Music Association award.

He released a second independent single in late 2013, shortly before announcing his signing a record deal with Big Machine and Universal Music (in a joint venture).
He was nominated for three Canadian country music awards: Video of the year (Duet), rising star, and video director of the year (for One More Girl's Love Like Mine).

In January 2015, Mack released his debut major label single, Before You Drive Me Crazy. The song peaked at #6 on the Canadian Country Billboard chart. In June 2015 Mack released his second major label single, The Way You Let Me Down (which peaked at number 11 on the Canadian Country Billboard chart) and began the first leg of Shania Twain's Rock This Country farewell tour serving as the only opening act.  After completing the first leg, Mack was asked by Twain to return for a number of additional performances in Canada in the fall. In September 2015, Mack performed on the CCMA Awards show and was nominated for two awards (Music video director of the year and songwriter of the year).

In 2016, Mack released a new single titled Listen To Me, and once again directed the music video, which featured a mixture of current footage, clips from Mack's childhood, sections from his teenage years as well as footage from his tour with Shania Twain. His album Edge of the Storm was nominated for Album of the Year at the 2016 CCMA Awards, where he was also nominated for Interactive Artist of the Year.

Acting career
From 2009 to 2010, MacInnes appeared in two CW shows, The Vampire Diaries and Smallville (where he played the supervillain Icicle in the two-hour TV movie Smallville: Absolute Justice). He also portrayed a young Bruce Greenwood, in the Hallmark Hall of Fame film A Dog Named Christmas.

In 2011, MacInnes was cast in a recurring role on CBC's Heartland as country musician Austin Mars - the romantic interest of series lead Mallory Wells. He also appeared in the Lifetime Network biopic Magic Beyond Words: The JK Rowling Story (starring Poppy Montgomery) playing the character Sean Harris – the real life inspiration for the Ron Weasley character in the literary and film franchise, Harry Potter.

In 2019, MacInnes appeared opposite Oscar-nominated actor Liam Neeson in the action thriller film, Cold Pursuit. MacInnes portrayed the character Dante.

Filmography

Discography

Studio albums

EPs

Singles

Music videos

Awards and nominations

References

External links
 
 
 Music website

Year of birth missing (living people)
Living people
Canadian male television actors
Canadian country singer-songwriters
Male actors from Calgary
Musicians from Calgary